The women's 3000 metres race of the 2014–15 ISU Speed Skating World Cup 1, arranged in the Meiji Hokkaido-Tokachi Oval, in Obihiro, Japan, was held on 14 November 2014.

Ireen Wüst of the Netherlands won, followed by Martina Sáblíková of the Czech Republic in second place, and Jorien Voorhuis of the Netherlands in third place. Ivanie Blondin of Canada won Division B.

Results
The race took place on Friday, 14 November, with Division B scheduled in the morning session, at 13:00, and Division A scheduled in the afternoon session, at 17:31.

Division A

Division B

References

Women 3000
1